Lochness is an album by Italian singer Mina, issued in 1993.

Track listing 

 Everything Happens to Me – 5:35
 Joana Francesa – 3:48
 Body and Soul / Non so dir (ti voglio bene) / Nuages – 5:58
 Nostalgias – 4:06
 Parlami d'amore Mariù – 2:01
 Love Me – 3:23
 Adoro – 4:35
 Con il nastro rosa – 4:55
 La notte – 3:52
 Teorema – 4:47

CD 2
 Si, l'amore – 4:05
 L'irriducibile – 4:20
 Stile libero – 3:02
 Raso – 4:30
 Mille motivi – 4:36
 Se avessi tempo – 4:14
 Om mani peme hum – 4:57
 Sì che non sei tu – 3:00
 Ti accompagnerò – 4:42
 Ninna pà – 2:57

1996 albums
Mina (Italian singer) albums